Bless the Harts is an American animated sitcom created by Emily Spivey for Fox's Animation Domination programming block. Premiering on September 29, 2019, the series is executive produced by Spivey, Andy Bobrow, Phil Lord, Christopher Miller, Kristen Wiig, and Seth Cohen. The series is a joint production between Fox Entertainment and 20th Television. The animation production is handled by Titmouse, Inc., with overseas animation services by Yearim and Digital eMation in Seoul, South Korea. The show's title is based on the Southern phrase "Bless your heart". Spivey and Bobrow served as co-showrunners for the series. 

In April 2021, Fox cancelled the series after two seasons, with the final episode airing on June 20, 2021.

Premise
Bless the Harts follows a working-class family living in North Carolina. The main protagonist, waitress Jenny Hart, struggles to make ends meet, and lives with her artistically talented daughter Violet Hart and mother Betty Hart. Her boyfriend Wayne has dated Jenny since her daughter Violet was a toddler, and acts as a father figure in Violet’s life. Jenny works at “The Last Supper”, a religious themed restaurant, with her best friend since high school, Brenda. The show's creator Emily Spivey has stated that it is based on her life growing up in High Point, North Carolina and is set in the state's Triad region. The name of the show's fictional town, Greenpoint, is a portmanteau of Greensboro and High Point; a map in the episode "The Last Supper" shows Greenpoint in northeast Forsyth County in the region.

Bless the Harts loosely shares a universe with the Fox series King of the Hill, which ran from 1997 to 2010. Spivey cites King of the Hill as her major influence for creating Bless the Harts. The fictional superstore Mega Lo Mart, first introduced in  King of the Hill, makes several appearances in Bless the Harts.

Cast

Main
 Kristen Wiig as Jenny Hart, a single mother who struggles to make money for her family by working as a waitress at the Last Supper. She ran out on her wedding to local wealthy legend Don Reynolds, but not before she got pregnant with his daughter. Wiig also voices Greenpoint newscaster Maykay Bueller.
 Maya Rudolph as Betty Hart, Jenny's widowed mother. In "Jenny Unfiltered" and "Betty's Birthday", her age is revealed to be 53. Even though her husband Ed is dead, he is mentioned multiple times in the series. Rudolph also voices Norma, Greenpoint's mail lady and Dr. Chakrabarti (season 1), Wayne's neighbor.
 Jillian Bell as Violet Hart, Jenny's daughter who loves art. Although sarcastic and cynical, she cares deeply about her family. She is either 13 years old (according to her voice actress) or a preteen (according to Betty). Reynolds is her biological father. Bell also voices Cherish, a mom with two teenage sons, as well as various background characters.
 Ike Barinholtz as Wayne Edwards, Jenny's boyfriend. Wayne's main goal is to win Violet's approval, though he has fears that he will never live up to Jenny's wealthy ex-boyfriend. Wayne is generally well-meaning, and his inner thought monologues reveal that he actually has serious and reflective concerns about being a good parental figure, but his outward attempts at expressing this usually fail awkwardly. Barinholtz also voices various background characters.
 Kumail Nanjiani as Jesus Christ, who appears as a figment of Jenny's imagination. Although, in "Toni with an I", Violet also sees him.
 Fortune Feimster as Brenda Clemmons (season 2; recurring season 1), Jenny's co-worker and best friend, and Bobbie-Nell, Jenny's elderly neighbor who picks fights with Wayne.

Recurring

 Emily Spivey as Louise, Jenny's boss, whose catchphrase whenever she enters is "Doot-dih-dih-doo", and various background characters.
 Drew Tarver as Randy, the town oddball and village idiot whose religion is Satanism, Charles Lee, a city councilman, and various background characters.
 Jeremy Rowley as Jimmy Lee, a city councilman, various background characters, Uncle Tommy, Wayne's child uncle, and Mayor Webb, the mayor of Greenpoint. Rowley provided the voice of Mayor Webb in season 1 and "The Last Supper". After, the role was recast to Jon Hamm, who took over in "Dead Mall".
 Oscar Montoya as David Brito, Violet's best friend.
 Andy Bobrow as Bud, the owner of a strip club, and various background characters.
 Gary Anthony Williams as Leonard, Wayne's co-worker and friend. Leonard does not have any lines in season 2 and only makes cameo appearances.
 Rich Blomquist as Daniel, Louise's unfaithful, uncaring and rude husband (Daniel passes away in "Big Pimpin'"), and various background characters.
 Christy Stratton as Dawn, a stripper and one of Jenny's friends, and various background characters.
 Mary Steenburgen as Crystalynn, Betty's arch-nemesis.
 Jon Hamm as Mayor Webb (starting with "Dead Mall"; see above)
 David Herman as Peter, Wayne's dim-witted co-worker, Benny, a cook at the Last Supper, and various background characters.
 Kevin Michael Richardson as Mr. Stikeleather, and various background characters.
 Grey DeLisle as MeeMaw Edwards (season 1), Ashleigh, and Mayor Webb's mother.
 Phil LaMarr as Reverend Ace, RJ Deerdeckers, Rayford, and various background characters.
 Holly Hunter as Marjune Gamble, a rich woman who is a member of the Ladies of Greenpoint.
 Janine Brito as a waitress at the Great Sydney Steakhouse.
 Ken Jeong as Doug, one of Wayne's co-workers.
 Michelle Buteau as Vanessa, Linda, Detective Bassett, and various background characters.
 JP Karliak as various background characters.
 Kenan Thompson as Travis, Wayne's childhood friend.

Guest
 John Solomon as Tracheo Steve
 Jee Young Han as Binh Ly
 Stephen Root as Rick Ocean
 Jorma Taccone as Craig
 Chris Parnell as Ian David Cole
 Susan Yeagley as Mary Jill and Dr. Pam
 Kristen Schaal as Stacey
 Natasha Lyonne as Debbie Donatello
 Ana Gasteyer as Sam
 Christopher Meloni as Detective Voccola
 Sal Vulcano as Bear Vulcano
 Fred Tatasciore as Henri Tomber
 Michael Hitchcock as Mr. Bigsby and a senator
 Daisuke Suzuki as Hiroki Kakatani
 Paula Pell as Ruth and Lenore
 Chris Diamantopoulos as Minister Mikey
 Drew Droege as Julian
 Jack McBrayer as Deputy Tug and Parker
 Sarah Baker as Pastor Joanne
 Harry Hamlin as Rod
 Tim Meadows as Sheriff Taylor
 Rachael MacFarlane as a dispatcher
 Swoosie Kurtz as Mee-Maw Edwards (season 2)
 Madhur Jaffrey as Dr. Charkabarti (season 2)
 Erin Andrews as herself
 Joe Buck as himself
 Fred Armisen as Leslie

Episodes

Series overview

Season 1 (2019–20)

Season 2 (2020–21)

Production

Development
On September 25, 2018, Fox gave the production a straight-to-series order for a first season consisting of thirteen episodes. The series was created by Emily Spivey, who was also expected to executive produce alongside Phil Lord, Christopher Miller, Kristen Wiig, and Seth Cohen. Production companies involved with the series were slated to include 20th Century Fox Television and Lord Miller Productions, but with the Disney acquisition of 21st Century Fox, the Fox Corporation was added as a production company (also copyright holder) later on.

The series debuted on September 29, 2019 as part of the Animation Domination programming block, and was renewed for a second season on October 18, 2019.

On November 27, 2019, writer, showrunner, and executive producer Andy Bobrow confirmed that 3 of the episodes in season 1 would air in season 2 as holdovers.

On April 22, 2020, the show joined the rest of Fox's Animation Domination lineup in a partnership with Caffeine for the AniDom Beyond Show, a recap series hosted by Andy Richter. The hour-long program featured interviews with guests and live interactivity with fans online, with recaps for the episodes that aired through April and May. While there was no Bless the Harts episode, on May 18, 2020, showrunner Andy Bobrow joined the series with other writers from the Fox Animation Domination lineup. The second season premiered on September 27, 2020.

The second season was produced during the COVID-19 pandemic, which impacted many other television productions, but left animated production largely unaffected. The series had a panel at the 2020 San Diego Comic-Con, which was marketed as "Comic-Con@Home", to promote the season, with Kristen Wiig, Maya Rudolph, Jillian Bell, Ike Barinholtz, Fortune Feimster, Andy Bobrow, Phil Lord, and Christopher Miller. On April 1, 2021, it was announced that the second season will be the show's last.

Casting
Alongside the initial series announcement, Kristen Wiig, Maya Rudolph, Jillian Bell, and Ike Barinholtz were cast in series regular roles. On January 11, 2019, Mary Steenburgen and Drew Tarver were cast in recurring roles. On July 25, 2020, during the San Diego Comic-Con@Home, the series' panel announced that Ken Jeong, Kristen Schaal, and Natasha Lyonne joined the cast in guest starring roles for the second season.

Release
Because of Citytv's deal with Fox, the series was also syndicated to Canada, airing new episodes the same day and time as the United States.

The show is also available to stream on Hulu, and able to purchase on YouTube and iTunes. In India, the series is simulcasted on Disney+ Hotstar because of 20th Television output deal with Star India.

On April 28, 2020, the Finland Fox channel had announced that they had picked up the series for syndication from 20th Television. The show debuted in Finland on May 9, 2020, in Finland and is available to stream on Ruutu free with commercials. Season 2 premiered on November 7, 2020.

Bless the Harts debuted on the Brazil Fox Premium channel on July 21, 2020.

The Dutch version of Comedy Central acquired both seasons.

The show is available to stream on Disney+ via the Star content hub in selected territories.

Reception

Critical response

On review aggregator Rotten Tomatoes, the series holds an approval rating of 82% based on 11 reviews, with an average rating of 6.5/10. The website's critical consensus reads, "With an exceptional cast and a big heart to boot, Bless the Harts particular worldview won't be for everyone, but it fits quite nicely into Fox's Animation Domination line-up". On Metacritic, it has a weighted average score of 70 out of 100, based on 10 critics, indicating "generally favorable reviews".

Bubbleblabber gave the first season a 6 out of 10, stating "this first season most definitely has more misses than hits in its line up which three more episodes likely wouldn’t have helped at this point. With this extra time to work on these and future episodes while taking in reception from this season, I think the next will really benefit in the long term. Plus, it gets the rare honor of being a new Fox animated show that actually GOT a second season, which has not happened since Bob's Burgers got its first renewal at the start of the decade. Fox is thinking outside the box to keep its adult animation thriving, which hopefully means more chances for exploration in future seasons. I’ll tell you what, these Harts are quite blessed to be given the chance to be Fox’s next enduring animated series."

The Parents Television Council, a frequent critic of Fox Broadcasting Company animated comedies like Family Guy, gave the first episode a negative review.

Ratings

Overall

Season 1

Season 2

Notes

References

External links

 

2019 American television series debuts
2021 American television series endings
2010s American sitcoms
2010s American adult animated television series
2010s American satirical television series
2020s American sitcoms
2020s American adult animated television series
2020s American satirical television series
American animated sitcoms
American adult animated comedy television series
Animated television series about dysfunctional families
English-language television shows
Fox Broadcasting Company original programming
Portrayals of Jesus on television
Television series by Fox Television Animation
Television series by 20th Century Fox Television
Television series by Fox Entertainment
Television shows set in North Carolina
Television series created by Emily Spivey